This is a list of railway stations within the county of Lancashire, a ceremonial county in North West England. It includes all Lancashire railway stations that currently have regular timetabled train services.

East-west connections are carried via the East Lancashire Line between Blackpool and  via , Preston,  and Burnley.

National Rail stations
All Lancashire stations are managed by Northern except for the following:

By Merseyrail: 

By Avanti West Coast:

Heritage stations

See also
 For other stations within the historic county boundaries of Lancashire (pre-1974) see:
 List of railway stations in Greater Manchester
 List of railway stations in Merseyside
 For closed stations see:
 List of closed railway stations in Lancashire
 List of closed railway stations in Greater Manchester
 List of closed railway stations in Merseyside

References

 List
Lancashire
Railway stations